This is the complete list of Commonwealth Games medallists in table tennis from 2002 to 2014.

Men's singles

Women's singles

Men's doubles

Women's doubles

Mixed doubles

Men's team

Women's team

References
Results Database from the Commonwealth Games Federation

Table tennis
Medalists

Commonw